The 22nd Continental Regiment was formed on 1 January 1776 when the 2nd Connecticut Regt (1775) of Spencer's Brigade in the Main Continental Army was re-designated. On 12 August 1776 Spencer's Brigade was re-designated as Parson's Brigade and on 12 November 1776 the brigade was reassigned to the Highland's Department. The regiment was reassigned to Mercer's Brigade of the Main Continental Army on the same date. On December 31, 1776, the regiment was dissolved in Peekskill, New York.

See also
2nd Connecticut Regt (1775)
 Levi Wells

References

Military units and formations of the Continental Army
1776 establishments in the United States